Cham Zereshk-e Sofla (also Romanized as Cham Zereshk-e Soflá) is a village in Dasht-e Hor Rural District, in the Central District of Salas-e Babajani County, Kermanshah Province, Iran. At the 2006 census, its population was 263, in 50 families.

References 

Populated places in Salas-e Babajani County